"Evening Star" is a song by English heavy metal band Judas Priest, originally released on their 1978 album Killing Machine, and released as a single in April 1979. Following the success of the previous single "Take on the World", it again charted in the UK but it only reached No. 53.

Personnel
Rob Halford – vocals
K. K. Downing – guitar
Glenn Tipton – guitar
Ian Hill – bass guitar
Les Binks – drums

Charts

References

1978 songs
1979 singles
Judas Priest songs
Songs written by Glenn Tipton
Songs written by Rob Halford
British hard rock songs